2-Methylimidazole is an organic compound that is structurally related to imidazole with the chemical formula CH3C3H2N2H. It is a white or colorless solid that is highly soluble in polar organic solvents and water. It is a precursor to a range of drugs and is a ligand in coordination chemistry.

Synthesis and reactions
It is prepared by condensation of glyoxal, ammonia and acetaldehyde, a Radziszewski reaction. Nitration gives 5-nitro derivative.

2-Methylimidazole is a sterically hindered imidazole that is used to simulate the coordination of histidine to heme complexes.  It can be deprotonated to make imidazolate-based coordination polymers.

Applications
2-Methylimidazole is a precursor to the several members of the nitroimidazole antibiotics that are used to combat anaerobic bacterial and parasitic infections.

Safety

2-Methylimidazole is a REACH Regulation Candidate Substance of Very High Concern due to its endocrine disrupting properties.

References

Imidazoles